The Alfa Romeo 158/159, also known as the Alfetta (Little Alfa in Italian), is a Grand Prix racing car produced by Italian manufacturer Alfa Romeo. It is one of the most successful racing cars ever; the 158 and its derivative, the 159, took 47 wins from 54 Grands Prix entered. It was originally developed for the pre-World War II voiturette formula (1937) and has a 1.5-litre straight-8 supercharged engine. Following World War II, the car was eligible for the new Formula One introduced in 1947. In the hands of drivers such as Nino Farina, Juan Manuel Fangio and Luigi Fagioli, it dominated the first two seasons of the World Championship of Drivers.

Overview 
The first version of this successful racing car, the 158, was made during 1937/1938. The main responsibility for engineering was given to Gioacchino Colombo.

The car's name refers to its 1.5-litre engine and eight cylinders. The voiturette class was for racing cars with 1.5-litre engines, standing in the same relation to the top 'Grand Prix' formula (usually for 3-litre engines) as the Formula Two does to Formula One today. Alfa's 3-litre racing cars in 1938 and 1939 were the Tipo 308, 312 and 316.

The 158 debuted with the works Alfa Corse team at the Coppa Ciano Junior in August 1938 at Livorno, Italy, where Emilio Villoresi took the car's first victory.
with the help of a single-stage Roots blower. More success came at the Coppa Acerbo, Coppa Ciano and Tripoli Grand Prix in May 1940.
Soon World War II stopped development of the car for six years. After the war the engine was developed further to push out  in 1946.

In 1947, the Alfetta was put back into service. The new rules allowed 1500 cc supercharged and 4500 cc naturally aspirated engines. The car made a tragic debut in the 1948 Swiss Grand Prix where Achille Varzi lost control of his car and was killed. Another loss for the team came in practice for the 1949 Buenos Aires Grand Prix, where Jean-Pierre Wimille was killed in an accident (driving with Simca-Gordini).

In 1950, the 158 was eligible for the new World Championship of Drivers. The car won every race in which it competed during that first season of Formula One; it was incredible that a car which had originated in 1938 was so victorious, most likely because all the other constructors (as few as there were) had less money to build and develop their cars and the Alfa had so much development time. The Alfa Romeo team included talented drivers such as Giuseppe "Nino" Farina and Juan Manuel Fangio, the latter of whom later won the World Drivers' Championship five times.

At the end of the 1950 season, a further updated version known as the 159 was produced, which was used for the 1951 season. In order to achieve this power however, the simplistically designed engine was fitted with larger superchargers over time. This fact, combined with the rich mixture required to burn methanol in the engine resulted in extremely poor fuel economy - the 159 achieved , compared to the Talbot-Lagos of the time, which delivered . The 1951 British Grand Prix at Silverstone was the first Formula One Grand Prix not won by an Alfa primarily because Fangio and Farina both had to stop twice simply to re-fuel their cars – and the Ferrari of José Froilán González did better on fuel and would go on to win the race, with Fangio second. Still, the Alfa had the edge on performance and with wins in Switzerland, France and Spain, Fangio won his first of five championships that year. For their second-to-last World Championship race (until 1979), the Italian Grand Prix at Monza, Alfa Romeo introduced a new evolution version known as the 159M, the "M" standing for Maggiorata ("enlarged").

After an unsuccessful bid by Alfa Romeo to obtain government assistance to meet development costs, the team announced their retirement from Grand Prix racing at the end of 1951 (leaving the development of the 2.5-litre Alfa Romeo 160). This, combined with problems for other Formula One teams lead to a decree by the FIA that all Grand Prix races counting towards the World Championship of Drivers in 1952 and 1953 would be for cars complying with Formula Two rather than Formula One.

The car's last Grand Prix win came in 1953 at Merano Grand Prix, Italy.

Race victories

Complete Formula One World Championship results
(key) (results in bold indicate pole position, results in italics indicate fastest lap)

* The Constructors' Championship was not awarded until 1958.

Legacy
The 158/159 Alfetta remains one of the most successful cars in the history of Formula One, having won every race it entered in 1950, and winning 4 out of 7 races (with a podium in all of the other 3) in 1951.

Notes 

158/159 Alfetta
Grand Prix cars
Formula One championship-winning cars